Protein methods are the techniques used to study proteins. There are experimental methods for studying proteins (e.g., for detecting proteins, for isolating and purifying proteins, and for characterizing the structure and function of proteins, often requiring that the protein first be purified). Computational methods typically use computer programs to analyze proteins. However, many experimental methods (e.g., mass spectrometry) require computational analysis of the raw data.

Genetic methods
Experimental analysis of proteins typically requires expression and purification of proteins. Expression is achieved by manipulating DNA that encodes the protein(s) of interest. Hence, protein analysis usually requires DNA methods, especially cloning. Some examples of genetic methods include conceptual translation, Site-directed mutagenesis, using a fusion protein, and matching allele with disease states. Some proteins have never been directly sequenced, however by translating codons from known mRNA sequences into amino acids by a method known as conceptual translation. (See genetic code.) Site-directed mutagenesis selectively introduces mutations that change the structure of a protein. The function of parts of proteins can be better understood by studying the change in phenotype as a result of this change. Fusion proteins are made by inserting protein tags, such as the His-tag, to produce a modified protein that is easier to track. An example of this would be GFP-Snf2H which consists of a protein bound to a green fluorescent protein to form a hybrid protein. By analyzing DNA alleles can be identified as being associated with disease states, such as in calculation of LOD scores.

Protein extraction from tissues
Protein extraction from tissues with tough extracellular matrices (e.g., biopsy samples, venous tissues, cartilage, skin) is often achieved in a laboratory setting by impact pulverization in liquid nitrogen. Samples are frozen in liquid nitrogen and subsequently subjected to impact or mechanical grinding. As water in the samples becomes very brittle at these temperature, the samples are often reduced to a collection of fine fragments, which can then be dissolved for protein extraction. Stainless steel devices known as tissue pulverizers are sometimes used for this purpose.

Advantages of these devices include high levels of protein extraction from small, valuable samples, disadvantages include low-level cross-over contamination.

Protein purification 
 Protein isolation
 Chromatography methods: ion exchange, size-exclusion chromatography (or gel filtration), affinity chromatography
 Protein extraction and solubilization
 Concentrating protein solutions
 Gel electrophoresis
 Gel electrophoresis under denaturing conditions
 Gel electrophoresis under non-denaturing conditions
 2D gel electrophoresis
 Electrofocusing

Detecting proteins
The considerably small size of protein macromolecules makes identification and quantification of unknown protein samples particularly difficult.  Several reliable methods for quantifying protein have been developed to simplify the process.  These methods include Warburg–Christian method, Lowry assay, and Bradford assay (all of which rely on absorbance properties of macromolecules).

Bradford assay method uses a dye to bind to protein.  Most commonly, Coomassie brilliant blue G-250 dye is used.  When free of protein, the dye is red but once bound to protein it turns blue.  The dye-protein complex absorbs light maximally at the wavelength 595 nanometers and is sensitive for samples containing anywhere from 1 ug to 60 ug.  Unlike Lowry and Warburg-Christian Methods, Bradford assays do not rely on Tryptophan and Tyrosine content in proteins which allows the method to be more accurate hypothetically.

Lowry assay is similar to biuret assays, but it uses Folin reagent which is more accurate for quantification.  Folin reagent is stable at only acidic conditions and the method is susceptible to skewing results depending on how much tryptophan and tyrosine is present in the examined protein.  The Folin reagent binds to tryptophan and tyrosine which means the concentration of the two amino acids affects the sensitivity of the method.  The method is sensitive at concentration ranges similar to the Bradford method, but requires a minuscule amount more of protein.

Warburg–Christian method screens proteins at their naturally occurring absorbance ranges.  Most proteins absorb light very well at 280 nanometers due to the presence of tryptophan and tyrosine, but the method is susceptible to varying amounts of the amino acids it relies on.

More methods are listed below which link to more detailed accounts for their respective methods.

Non-specific methods that detect total protein only 
Absorbance: Read at 280 or 215 nm. Can be very inaccurate. Detection in the range of 100 μg/mL to 1 mg/mL. Ratio of absorbance readings taken at 260/280 can indicate purity/contamination of the sample (pure samples have a ratio <0.8)
Bradford protein assay: Detection in the range of ~1 mg/mL
Biuret Test Derived Assays:
Bicinchoninic acid assay (BCA assay): Detection down to 0.5 μg/mL
Lowry Protein assay: Detection in the range of 0.01–1.0 mg/mL
Fluorescamine: Quantifies proteins and peptides in solution if primary amine are present in the amino acids
Amido black: Detection in the range of 1-12 μg/mL
Colloidal gold: Detection in the range of 20 - 640 ng/mL
Nitrogen detection:
Kjeldahl method: used primarily for food and requires oxidation of material
Dumas method: used primarily for food and requires combustion of material

Specific methods which can detect amount of a single protein 
Spectrometry methods:
High-performance liquid chromatography (HPLC): Chromatography method to detect proteins or peptides 
Liquid chromatography–mass spectrometry (LC/MS): Can detect proteins at low concentrations (ng/mL to pg/mL) in blood and body fluids, such as for Pharmacokinetics.
Antibody dependent methods:
Enzyme-linked immunosorbent assay (ELISA): Specifically can detect protein down to pg/mL.
Protein immunoprecipitation:  technique of precipitating a protein antigen out of solution using an antibody that specifically binds to that particular protein.
Immunoelectrophoresis: separation and characterization of proteins based on electrophoresis and reaction with antibodies.
Western blot: couples gel electrophoresis and incubation with antibodies to detect specific proteins in a sample of tissue homogenate or extract (a type of Immunoelectrophoresis technique).
Protein immunostaining

Protein structures
X-ray crystallography
Protein NMR
Cryo-electron microscopy
Small-angle X-ray scattering
Circular Dichroism

Interactions involving proteins
Protein footprinting

Protein–protein interactions
(Yeast) two-hybrid system
Protein-fragment complementation assay
Co-immunoprecipitation
Affinity purification and mass spectrometry
Proximity ligation assay
Proximity labeling

Protein–DNA interactions
ChIP-on-chip
Chip-sequencing
DamID
Microscale thermophoresis

Protein–RNA interactions
Toeprinting assay
TCP-seq

Computational methods
Molecular dynamics
Protein structure prediction 
Protein sequence alignment (sequence comparison, including BLAST)
Protein structural alignment
Protein ontology (see gene ontology)

Other methods
Hydrogen–deuterium exchange
Mass spectrometry
Protein sequencing 
Protein synthesis
Proteomics
Peptide mass fingerprinting
Ligand binding assay
Eastern blotting
Metabolic labeling
Heavy isotope labeling
Radioactive isotope labeling

See also
CSH Protocols
Current Protocols

Bibliography
Daniel M. Bollag, Michael D. Rozycki and Stuart J. Edelstein. (1996.) Protein Methods, 2 ed., Wiley Publishers. .

References